Jastrzębia  is a village in Radom County, Masovian Voivodeship, in east-central Poland. It is the seat of the gmina (administrative district) called Gmina Jastrzębia.

The village has a population of 820.

References

Villages in Radom County